Hermann Paul Nitsche (November 25, 1876 – March 25, 1948) was a German psychiatrist known for his expert endorsement of the Third Reich's euthanasia authorization and who later headed the Medical Office of the T-4 Euthanasia Program.

Paul Nitsche was born on November 25, 1876 in Colditz, Saxony. His father Hermann Nitsche was a psychiatrist. He attended elementary school in Pirna (German: Volksschule) from 1882 to 1887. He was condemned to death for crimes against humanity for killing over one thousand people, and was guillotined in March 1948 in Dresden.

Career
Nitsche received his medical license in 1901 and a professorship in 1925. Nitsche did not join the Nazi Party until May 1933. He was a strong supporter of eugenics and euthanasia and was present at the gassing demonstration at what would become the Brandenburg euthanasia center in either December 1939 or January 1940. He was driven not so much by Nazi racial ideology as by his own support of racial science and his vision of "progressive medicine".  Being well established, Nitsche was no longer motivated by the prospect of career advancement but was rather ideologically committed when he later joined Action T4.

Euthanasia
He was deputy director of the Sonnenstein Clinic from 1913 to 1918 and director of the institution 1928 to 1939. In 1940 he became deputy director of the Action T4 Medical Office (German: Medizinische Abteilung) under Werner Heyde, which had a front organization called the Reich Cooperative for State Hospitals and Nursing Homes (German: Reichsarbeitsgemeinschaft Heil- und Pflegeanstalten) that handled the registration, evaluation, and selection of patients for adult euthanasia. As the T4 program's chief physician, Nitsche was responsible for corresponding with mental health institutions about registering and transferring patients to be euthanized.

He succeeded Heyde as head of the Medical Office in December 1941.

Trial and execution
He was arrested on March 11, 1945. His trial took place from June 16, 1947, to July 7, 1947. He was condemned to death for crimes against humanity on the basis of Allied Control Council Law No. 10 for killing over one thousand people. He attempted to justify his actions, saying they were intended to free the sick from pain. He was executed by guillotine on March 25, 1948, in Dresden.

See also
Action T4
Doctors' Trial

Notes

References 

 Boris Böhm, Hagen Markwardt: Hermann Paul Nitsche (1876–1948) – Zur Biografie eines Reformpsychiaters und Hauptakteurs der NS-"Euthanasie". In: Stiftung Sächsische Gedenkstätten (Hrsg.): Nationalsozialistische Euthanasieverbrechen. Beiträge zur Aufarbeitung ihrer Geschichte in Sachsen. Michael Sandstein Verlag, Dresden 2004. .
 Ernst Klee: "Euthanasie" im NS-Staat. Die "Vernichtung lebensunwerten Lebens". S. Fischer Verlag, Frankfurt am Main 1983. .
 Ernst Klee (Hrsg.): Dokumente zur "Euthanasie". Fischer Taschenbuch Verlag, Frankfurt am Main 1985, .
 Götz Aly (Hrsg.): Aktion T4 1939–1945. Die "Euthanasie"-Zentrale in der Tiergartenstraße 4. Edition Hentrich, 2. erweiterte Auflage, Berlin, 1989. .
 Joachim S. Hohmann: Der "Euthanasie"-Prozeß von Dresden 1947. Eine zeitgeschichtliche Dokumentation. Frankfurt a.M., 1993
 Thomas Schilter: Unmenschliches Ermessen. Die nationalsozialistische "Euthanasie"-Tötungsanstalt Pirna-Sonnenstein 1940/41. Leipzig, 1998
 Alexander Mitscherlich, Fred Mielke: Medizin ohne Menschlichkeit. Dokumente des Nürnberger Ärzteprozesses. Frankfurt a.M., 1960

1876 births
1948 deaths
People from Colditz
Holocaust perpetrators in Germany
People from the Kingdom of Saxony
Nazis executed by East Germany by guillotine
German psychiatrists
Aktion T4 personnel
History of psychiatry
German people convicted of crimes against humanity
Executed people from Saxony
People executed for crimes against humanity
Physicians in the Nazi Party
Executed mass murderers